Port Talbot Town Ladies F.C. is a football team, playing in the Welsh Premier Women's League, which they joined in 2012 – the first season to feature a single division league.

The club plays its home matches at  Victoria Road, Port Talbot, which has a capacity of 6,000.

History
Founder members of the single division Welsh Premier Women's League in 2012, Port Talbot Town have been an ever-present part of the league finishing no lower than 7th in all of their top flight seasons. They have also reached the semi-final stages multiple times of both the FAW Women's Cup and Welsh Premier League Cup.

Current squad 
.

References

External links 
 Official website
 Twitter account

Women's football clubs in Wales
Welsh Premier Women's Football League clubs